Puravalan Narayanasamy, known by his stage name Puravalan, is a Singaporean Tamil television and theatre actor who is known for his one man show Bhisma -The Grandshire. In 2020, he starred in the Zee5 series Uyire.

Filmography

Television

Theatre

Films

Awards and Nominations

External links

References

Living people
People from Singapore
Singaporean people of Tamil descent
Singaporean people of Indian descent
Singaporean actors
Tamil male television actors
Tamil television presenters
Tamil male actors
21st-century Tamil male actors
Year of birth missing (living people)